The Federal Riot Gun (FRG) is a firearm made by Federal Laboratories Inc., designed to fire non-lethal munitions. Its ammunition includes 37 and 38mm baton and tear gas rounds. The baton rounds were cylindrical, rubber projectiles.

The most popular model, 37-mm M201-Z, has a distinctive ringed barrel.

History
Introduced in the 1930s by Federal Laboratories Inc., of Pennsylvania, the FRG became the standard riot gun used by the British Army throughout The Troubles in Northern Ireland. 

A single-shot weapon, which breaks open by unlocking a catch at the top, it has since been replaced in British use by the multiple-shot ARWEN 37 revolver. It was also issued by the Canadian Army, subsequently the Canadian Armed Forces.

Non-lethal design

Fired at a relatively low velocity, the baton rounds are intended to knock rioters down, or momentarily stun them, but not to cause serious injury or death.

Field experience
Safe operating procedures in the British Army eventually ruled out firing the gun directly at rioters, as it was found that the rounds could cause serious and permanent injuries. 

In 1993, a constable of the Bermuda Police Service, acting the role of enemy for a rifle company of the Bermuda Regiment, being exercised at Camp Lejeune USMC Base, was seriously injured by a baton round fired from a soldier's FRG, shattering his jaw, which required extensive surgery to reconstruct. 

Subsequently, orders were given that the weapons were to be fired into the ground ahead of rioters. The baton rounds would deflect upwards into the rioters, but would lose kinetic energy in the process.

References

External links

AR 80 Lowers & Parts
Bulletproof Clothing & Helmet
Kimber Micro 9 STG Semi-Auto Pistol

Riot guns
Riot control weapons
Teargas grenade guns